Vic Gomersall is a footballer who played as a full back in the Football League for Manchester City and Swansea Town.

He also played for Llanelli, Haverfordwest County and Pontardawe Town.

He now presents and entertains the LT10 hospitality lounge on home match days for his former club Swansea City

References

1942 births
Living people
Footballers from Manchester
Association football fullbacks
Manchester City F.C. players
Swansea City A.F.C. players
Chelmsford City F.C. players
English Football League players
English footballers
Llanelli Town A.F.C. players
Haverfordwest County A.F.C. players
Pontardawe Town F.C. players